The Territorial Waters Jurisdiction Act 1878 (41 & 42 Vict. c. 73) is an Act of the Parliament of the United Kingdom. It is still in force. It codifies the law relating to offences committed in the territorial waters of the United Kingdom, including crimes committed on foreign ships. Under section 7 of the Act, the applicable law is the law of England and Wales, even if the offence is committed off the coast of Scotland or Northern Ireland.

Section 3 of the Act requires the consent of the Secretary of State to prosecute someone under the Act if they are not a British subject.

See also
Offences at Sea Act 1799
Piracy Act 1837

References
 Paterson, William (ed). "Territorial Waters Jurisdiction Act, 1878". The Practical Statutes of the Session 1878. Law Times Office. London. 1878. Pages 341 to 346.
 

English criminal law
United Kingdom Acts of Parliament 1878
Borders of the United Kingdom